The Oregon Trail: American Settler is a freemium game developed by Gameloft and released on November 17, 2011. It is a sequel to Gameloft's 2009 reboot of The Oregon Trail.

Gameplay
Taking place narratively after a player completes a standard game of The Oregon Trail, players of American Settler have to build a new town in the frontier. Like many other freemium titles, players have to acquire money and use it to purchase buildings and other goods to keep production flourishing. The game play is similar to other games from the same genres of farming simulator, such as FarmVille, and FrontierVille sharing the same top down perspective of the landscape.

Release 
American Settler was released on November 17, 2011.

Reception

The game has a Metacritic rating of 66/100 based on 4 critic reviews. Multiplayer.it claimed the game was fun at first, but soon went downhill. They gave the game a 65/100.

References

External links
 
 

2011 video games
Gameloft games
Adventure games
IOS games
IOS-only games
The Oregon Trail (series)
Video games developed in the United States
Video games set in the United States
Video games set in the 19th century